Jennifer Roos (born July 17, 1971) was the head women's basketball coach for the Bowling Green Falcons women's basketball team from 2012 through 2018.

Early life
Roos is from Louisville, Kentucky.  She played basketball, field hockey, and lacrosse for Davidson.  She earned her degree in history from Davidson University in 1993.

Coaching career
Early in her career Roos was an assistant at Davidson. Roos was a long time assistant at Bowling Green under Curt Miller from 2001 through 2012.  Miller's teams were very successful winning eight MAC titles. On April 16, 2012 she was named Bowling Green's head coach when Miller accepted the head coach position at Indiana. Her initial teams were successful.  Bowling Green won 24 games in 2012–13. In her second season in 2013–14 the Falcons won 30 games and won the MAC regular season title and she was MAC coach of the year. Her later teams were not as successful. She was fired by BGSU on March 8, 2018.

Head coaching record

References

External links
 Bowling Green coaching biography

1971 births
Living people
American female field hockey players
American women's basketball coaches
Basketball players from Louisville, Kentucky
Bowling Green Falcons women's basketball coaches
Davidson Wildcats field hockey players
Davidson Wildcats women's basketball coaches
Davidson Wildcats women's basketball players
Davidson Wildcats women's lacrosse players
Sportspeople from Louisville, Kentucky